Awati is a village in the Karmala taluka of Solapur district in Maharashtra state, India. It is Famous For   Sufi Saint Sufi Hazrat Chand Pasha Qadri Qalandar Darvesh.

Demographics
Covering  and comprising 340 households at the time of the 2011 census of India, Awati had a population of 1872. There were 955 males and 917 females, with 220 people being aged six or younger.

References

Villages in Karmala taluka